Bull Run Lake is a reservoir, an impoundment of the Bull Run River in the U.S. state of Oregon.  Providing part of the primary drinking water supply for Portland, Oregon, it rates highly as an oligotrophic lake, a very clean source of water. As of 1925, noted geographer Lewis A. McArthur described the lake as one of the two most important in the state (along with Crater Lake), supplying the drinking water for a third of the state's population.

Public access to the area has been controlled since June 17, 1892, with the creation of the Bull Run Reserve by President Benjamin Harrison. Water from the reservoir first flowed into the Portland water system on January 2, 1895. President Theodore Roosevelt restricted entry to all but government agents and water company employees and banned stock grazing on April 28, 1904.

At least two series of efforts were made between 1917 and 1925 to decrease lake seepage.

In 1994, concerns of outflow water temperature and its effect on fish populations led to regular careful measurements of the lake's thermocline characteristics and the inlet water temperature.  Concrete pier blocks were installed to minimize the effect of water temperature shock on downstream aquatic life.

See also
 List of lakes in Oregon

References 

Reservoirs in Oregon
Lakes of Multnomah County, Oregon
Lakes of Clackamas County, Oregon
Mount Hood National Forest
Buildings and structures in Multnomah County, Oregon
Buildings and structures in Clackamas County, Oregon
Protected areas of Clackamas County, Oregon
Protected areas of Multnomah County, Oregon
1895 establishments in Oregon